Events in the year 1981 in Belgium.

Incumbents

Monarch: Baudouin
Prime Minister: 
 until 31 March: Wilfried Martens 
 31 March-17 December: Mark Eyskens  
 starting 17 December: Wilfried Martens

Events
July 30 - Belgian Anti-Racism Law
October 20 - 1981 Antwerp bombing
November 8 - General election

Publications
 Cowboy Henk strip first published
 OECD, Economic Surveys: Belgium, Luxembourg
 Rita Lejeune and Jacques Stiennon (eds.), La Wallonie, le Pays et les Hommes: Lettres, Arts, Culture, vol. 4 (La Renaissance du Livre, Brussels)

Births
January
 4 January – Silvy De Bie, singer
 6 January – Jérémie Renier, actor

February
 4 February – Johan Vansummeren, cyclist
 27 February
 Evi Goffin, singer
 Élodie Ouédraogo, sprinter

April
10 April – Yves V, DJ and producer

May
 3 May – Lieven Scheire, comedian

June
 2 June – Kurt Hovelijnck, cyclist

July
 15 July – Sébastien Rosseler, cyclist

October
 3 October – Lydia Klinkenberg, politician

Deaths
January 27 - Leo Collard (born 1902), politician
February 7 - Marius Mondelé, footballer
February 9 - Albert Dejonghe (born 1894), cyclist
April 5 - Émile Hanse (born 1892), footballer
May 19 - Marcel Vercammen, footballer
August 29 - Joseph Givard, footballer
October 21 - Wilfried Puis (born 1943), footballer
November 29 - Dieudonné Smets, cyclist

References

 
1980s in Belgium